Chakma language (autonym:) is an Indo-Aryan language spoken by the Chakma and Daingnet people. The language has common features with other languages in the region like the Chittagonian, Tanchangya, Arakanese and others. It is spoken by around 380,000 people. 150,000 of these are in southeast Bangladesh, primarily the Chittagong Hill Tracts, and another 230,000 in India, including 97,000 in Mizoram, Tripura and Arunachal Pradesh. It is written using the Chakma script, but literacy in this script is low.

Status
It is officially recognized by the Government of Tripura in India and also by the Government of Bangladesh. In India, it is also spoken primarily in the Chakma Autonomous District Council (CADC) which consists of the Tuichawng constituency of Lawngtlai district in Mizoram and many places in Tripura.

Although there were no Chakma language radio or television stations as of 2011, the language has a presence in social media and on YouTube. The Hill Education Chakma Script website provides tutorials, videos, e-books, and Chakma language forums.

In 2012, the Government of Tripura announced the implementation of Chakma language in Chakma Script (or Ajhā Pāṭh) in primary schools of Tripura. Imparting of education up to the elementary stage in the mother tongue is a national policy. To begin with, Chakma language subjects in its own scripts has been introduced in 87 primary schools in Chakma concentrated areas in Tripura."

"In preparation for the January 2014 education season, the national curriculum and textbook board has already started printing books in six languages ... Chakma, Kokborok (Tripura community), Marma, Santal, Sadri (Orao community) and Achik."

Mor Thengari (My Bicycle) was Bangladesh's first Chakma-language movie. However, it was banned in Bangladesh due to its controversial plot.

Phonology

Vowels

Consonants 

Medieval Chakma
The Chakma and Daingnet people now speak what may be considered divergent dialects of Magadhi Prakrit. However, this is due to language shift from a Tibeto-Burman language; that medieval language may have been related to Sak or Chairel (and therefore of the Brahmaputran branch).

Writing system

The Chakma script is an abugida that belongs to the Brahmic family of scripts. Chakma evolved from the Burmese script, which was ultimately derived from Pallava.

Educational institutions
The Chakma language is being taught in many Government and private schools in India (Tripura, Mizoram, Arunachal Pradesh) and Bangladesh. The Chakma language was officially introduced in primary schools by the Govt. of Tripura under The Directorate of Kokborok & Other Minority Languages in 2004 through Bengali Script and since 2013 through Chakma script (also known as Ajhā Pāṭh). Presently, the Chakma language is being taught in 87 schools.

References

Cāṅmā, Cirajyoti and Maṅgal Cāṅgmā. 1982. Cāṅmār āg pudhi (Chakma primer). Rāṅamāṭi:Cāṅmābhāṣā Prakāśanā Pariṣad.
Khisa, Bhagadatta. 2001. Cāṅmā pattham pāt (Chakma primer.) Rāṅamāṭi: Tribal Cultural Institute(TCI).
Singā. 2004. Phagadāṅ

External links

Unicode Font for the language
Chakma Script 
Chakma Bangla Blog
Chakma Prototype Keyboard
Chakma Unicode Converter
Available Chakma Unicode Font

 

Eastern Indo-Aryan languages
Languages of Bangladesh
Chakma
Languages of Mizoram
Languages of Tripura
Languages of Arunachal Pradesh